Paweł Czapiewski (born 30 March 1978) is a former Polish middle-distance runner. He was born in Stargard.

He came third in the 2001 World Championships in Edmonton in a personal best time of 1:44.63 minutes. Later that month he lowered it to 1:43.22 min. He later won the 2002 European Indoor Athletics Championships.

He has officially retired on 21 July 2012 at the Janusz Kusociński Memorial having earlier failed to qualify for the 2012 Olympic Games.

Personal bests
Outdoor
 600 m – 1:16.83 (Kraków 2008)
 800 m – 1:43.22 (Zürich 2001 NR)
 1000 m – 2:17.22 (Kraków 2002)
 1500 m – 3:40.14 (Biala Podlaska 2005)

Indoor
 800 m – 1:44.78 (Wien 2002 NR)
 1000 m – 2:19.00 (Erfurt 2001 NR)
 1500 m – 3:38.96 (Stuttgart 2002)

Competition record

See also
 Polish records in athletics

References

External links

 

1978 births
Living people
Polish male middle-distance runners
Athletes (track and field) at the 2008 Summer Olympics
Olympic athletes of Poland
People from Stargard
World Athletics Championships medalists
Sportspeople from West Pomeranian Voivodeship
Competitors at the 2001 Goodwill Games
20th-century Polish people
21st-century Polish people